Marián Šuchančok (born 13 July 1971) is a retired Slovak international footballer who played as a defender for clubs in Slovakia, Greece and Austria.

Club career
Born in Košice, Šuchančok began playing football with local side FK Slavoj Trebišov.

In January 2002, he would move abroad to play for Greek Superleague side Akratitos F.C., where he would make 11 league appearances before leaving in January 2003.

International career
Šuchančok made nine appearances for the Slovakia national football team from 1999 to 2001, including one FIFA World Cup qualifying match.

References

External links

1971 births
Living people
Slovak footballers
Slovakia international footballers
FK Inter Bratislava players
A.P.O. Akratitos Ano Liosia players
Kapfenberger SV players

Association football defenders
Sportspeople from Košice